Pablo Landeo Muñoz (Huancavelica, Perú, 1959) is a Peruvian award-winning writer, translator, and teacher of language and literature. His literary works are written in Quechua and Spanish.

Education and career 
Pablo Landeo Muñoz studied literature at Peru's National University of San Marcos in Lima, where he got his Bachelor's and Master's degrees. Currently he is completing graduate studies at Paris's INALCO where he also teaches Quechua language and culture. In 2019 he was the writer in residence at the Quechua program of the University of Pennsylvania in Philadelphia, where he offered talks on Quechua literature.

Landeo-Muñoz is the director of the literary magazine Atuqpa Chupan ("The fox’s tail" in Quechua), which is published annually and written entirely in Quechua.

Literary works 
In 2011 he published the book Los hijos de Babel in Spanish.  In 2013 he published a collection of stories from Huancavelica in Quechua Ayacucho under the title Wankawillka, complemented by translations into Spanish and a study in Quechua.

Peru's National Prize of Literature
In 2016 Landeo-Muñoz published the novel Aqupampa, considered the first major novel written in Quechua without a Spanish translation. In 2018 the novel was awarded Peru's National Prize of Literature, Category of Indigenous Languages. The novel describes stories of rural migration to Peru's capital, Pueblos jóvenes, and the violence of the Shining Path in the 20th Century.

Bibliography

Research publications 
 2014: Categorías andinas para una aproximación al willakuy. Umallanchikpi kaqkuna. Asamblea Nacional de Rectores, Lima. (Masters thesis)

Poetry in Spanish 
 2011: Los hijos de babel. Perú Grupo Pakarina, Lima

Short stories in Quechua
 2013: Wankawillka. Hanaqpacha ayllukunapa willakuynin. Perú Grupo Pakarina, Lima

Novel in Quechua 
 2016: Aqupampa. Perú Grupo Pakarina, Instituto Francés de Estudios Andinos, Lima. 106 pages.

References

External links 
 Video: Quechua-language literary night with Pablo Landeo Muñoz, Irma Alvarez Ccoscco and Américo Mendoza Mori at Kelly Writers House, University of Pennsylvania 
 Pablo Landeo Muñoz. Aqupampa Quyllur, fragment of the novel Aqupampa, 20 de mayo de 2015.
 Pablo Landeo Muñoz, Atuqpa Chupan. «Runasimipi qillqaqmasiykunata qayakuy» (espejo), 29 March 2013.
 Libros peruanos: Pablo Landeo Muñoz
 César Itier. «Aqupampa, de Pablo Landeo Muñoz, la primera novela escrita en quechua» (PDF). 17 de julio de 2016.
 Museo de arte de Lima – «MALI ofrece en quechua el recorrido por sus salas de exhibición permanente».

Living people
Quechua-language writers
Quechua language activists
1959 births
Peruvian male poets
Male novelists
Peruvian novelists
Peruvian male short story writers
Peruvian short story writers
21st-century Peruvian poets
21st-century novelists
21st-century short story writers
21st-century male writers
People from Huancavelica Region
National University of San Marcos alumni